Palast is a German surname. Notable people with the surname include:

Geri Palast, Managing Director of the Israel Action Network 
Greg Palast (born 1952), American author and freelance journalist

German-language surnames